In the 2005–06 season of competitive football (soccer) in Cape Verde

Diary of the season
No football competition of the Santiago Island League (North) took place
Avenida 77 and Jentabus football (soccer) clubs established, based in Praia on the island of Santiago
Paiol and Praia Rural merged into Unidos do Norte
Sporting Clube do Porto Novo celebrated its 50th anniversary of foundation of the club
 October 15: CD Travadores celebrated its 75th anniversary of its foundation of the club and the sports department
 January 1 - Benfica da Brava celebrated its 10th anniversary of its foundation
 January 22 - No sports competitions due to the parliamentary elections that took place
 February 12 - No sports competitions due to the presidential elections that took place
 February 14 - Académica do Porto Novo celebrated its 25th anniversary
Sport Sal Rei Club won their 5th title  for Boa Vista
Nô Pintcha won their 11th and recent title for Brava
Botafogo won their 16th title for Fogo
Barreirense won their 1st title for Maio
Académico do Aeroporto won their 7th title for Sal
Sporting Clube da Praia won their 2nd title for Santiago South
Beira Mar won their only title Santo Antão North
Sporting Clube do Porto Novo won their 1st title for Santo Antão South
FC Ultramarina won their 6th title for São Nicolau
CS Mindelense won their 43rd title for São Vicente
May 1: Vitória da Praia celebrated its 75th anniversary
May 5: 2006 Cape Verdean Football Championships began
May 6: Derby defeated Sporting Porto Novo 3-0 and was the highest match for two rounds and being the sole one for a round
May 13: Sal Rei defeated Sporting Porto Novo away 0-3 and made it the second match being the highest which lasted for a round
May 21: Académico do Aeroporto defeated Barreirense from Maio 6-1 and made it the highest scoring match for a round
June 1: The match between Sal Rei and Nô Pintcha was rescheduled to June 1, Sal Rei won 2-0
June 4:
Derby defeated Brava's Nô Pintcha 7-1 and made it the highest scoring match of the season
18:00: Regular season ends
July 10: Knockout stage begins
June 17: Académico do Aeroporto defeated Botafogo 6-0 and made it another match being the second highest of the season, one of three and one of the highest ever at the knockout stage of the national championships
June 24: Championship finals begins
July 2 - Sporting Clube da Praia claimed their 5th national championship title

Final standings

Cape Verdean Football Championships

FC Derby and Académico do Aeroporto were first in each group along with  Botafogo of São Filipe and Sporting Praia, second of each group.  Académico do Aeroporto do Sal and Sporting Praia had the most points numbering 12 .  Derby scored the most with 13 goals followed by Académico do Aeroporto with 12 goals, Botafogo with nine and Sporting with eight.  In the semis, Académico do Aeroporto advanced into the finals with 8 goals scored in two matches, the largest in the second leg match where they defeated Botafogo 6-0 in Espargos which made it one of the highest scored match at the knockout stage of the national championships.  Also Sporting Praia advanced to the finals with 2 goals scored over Derby in two legs, Sporting won the first with 2 goals and Derby won the second with a goal.  In the finals, Sporting defeated Sal's Académico do Aeroporto at Estádio Marcelo Leitão in Espargos 0-1, the match in Praia ended in a two goal draw, with a total of 3 goals scored by Sporting Praia, they won their fifth championship match, their next in four years

Group A

Group B

Final Stages

Leading goalscorer: Mendes - 7 goals

Island or regional competitions

Regional Championships

Regional Cups

Regional Super Cups
The 2005 champion winner played with a 2005 cup winner (when a club won both, a second place club competed).

Regional Opening Tournaments

See also
2005 in Cape Verde
2006 in Cape Verde
Timeline of Cape Verdean football

References

 
 
2005 in association football
2006 in association football